Climate change in Washington may refer to:

 Climate change in Washington (state)
 Climate change in Washington, D.C.